Sirrine Stadium is a stadium in Greenville, South Carolina, United States. It was used by Furman University's American football team from 1936 to 1980. The stadium opened on October 31, 1936 with a Furman victory over Davidson. It has a seating capacity of 15,000. It is currently used by the Greenville High School Red Raiders and has hosted the HBCU Classic since 2005. It is the home of Greenville FC from the National Premier Soccer League.

References

Defunct college football venues
Furman Paladins football
High school football venues in the United States
American football venues in South Carolina
Sports venues in Greenville, South Carolina